Stary Gaj is a village in the administrative district of Gmina Wojciechów, within Lublin County, Lublin Voivodeship, in eastern Poland.
Through the village passes river Czerka.

References

Villages in Lublin County